The Jiye are an ethnic group living in the Kathangor Hills in Eastern Equatoria state, South Sudan. They speak a dialect of the Toposa language.

Culture 
The Jiye are seasonal pastoralists that mainly raise cattle. Women and children generally live in settled villages while men leave the village for the season to feed the cattle on pastures. In the villages, women engage in farming and cultivate crops like cow peas, maize, millet, and tobacco. Cattle play a major role in Jiye culture and are incorporated into the religious system of the Jiye.

References

Ethnic groups in South Sudan

Read about the daily life in the Jiye tribe villages in South Sudan